Sir Robert Williams, 1st Baronet JP (15 June 1848 – 15 April 1943) was a Conservative Party politician in the United Kingdom. He was elected as Member of Parliament (MP) for West Dorset at a by-election in May 1895, and held the seat until he stepped down from the House of Commons at the 1922 general election.

He was made a baronet, in 1915, of Bridehead in the county of Dorset.

References

External links 
 

1848 births
1943 deaths
Williams, Sir Robert, 1st baronet
Conservative Party (UK) MPs for English constituencies
UK MPs 1892–1895 
UK MPs 1895–1900
UK MPs 1900–1906
UK MPs 1906–1910
UK MPs 1910
UK MPs 1910–1918
UK MPs 1918–1922
Politics of Dorset